The year 2012 was the 231st year of the Rattanakosin Kingdom of Thailand. It was the 67th year in the reign of King Bhumibol Adulyadej (Rama IX), and is reckoned as year 2555 in the Buddhist Era.

Incumbents
King: Bhumibol Adulyadej 
Crown Prince: Vajiralongkorn
Prime Minister: Yingluck Shinawatra
Supreme Patriarch: Nyanasamvara Suvaddhana

Events

March
2012 Southern Thailand bombings took place on March 31, 2012. It hit Yala, Yala Province and Hat Yai, Songkhla Province.

June
Miss Universe Thailand 2012 took place on June 2.Nutpimon Natthayalak was the winner.

September
2012 PTT Thailand Open took place from September 22 to September 30. Richard Gasquet was the winner of the singles tournament and Lu Yen-hsun and Danai Udomchoke were the winners of the doubles tournament

October
On October 20, Grand Sport Group became Thailand national football team's kit supplier and sponsor.

Births

Deaths

See also
 2012 Thai Premier League
 2012 Thai Division 1 League
 2012 AFC U-16 Championship
 Thailand at the 2012 Summer Olympics
 Economy in Thailand recovery in 2012 and onwards
 2012 in Thai television
 List of Thai films of 2012

References

External links
Year 2012 Calendar - Thailand

 
Years of the 21st century in Thailand
Thailand